Justine Clarke (born 16 November 1971) is an Australian actress, musician, author and television host. 

Justine has been acting since the age of seven and has appeared in some of Australia's best-known TV shows. She is best known as a presenter on the Australian children's show Play School, a role with she has held since 1999. She is also a film and stage actor, and won the Best Actress Award at the Mar del Plata International Film Festival in Argentina in 2006 for her role in independent film Look Both Ways. She has won two ARIA Awards.

Early life

Justine Clarke was born in Sydney, New South Wales, to Beverly, an actress and singer and Len, a singer

At the age of seven, while attending Woollahra Public School with other up and coming talents like Mouche Phillips and Deni Hines, she began appearing in television commercials, one of which was Arnott's Humphrey B. Bear biscuits. At eleven she played the role of Brigitta in the stage musical, The Sound of Music.

Film and television
Clarke's first significant acting role was as the character Anna Goanna in the 1985 film Mad Max Beyond Thunderdome. The same year she appeared in the TV series The Maestro's Company and featured in the 1986 mini-series Professor Poopsnaggle's Steam Zeppelin. The following year she made appearances in A Country Practice and Willing and Abel.

Clarke appeared in a telemovie Touch the Sun, by the Australian Children's Television Foundation

In 1987, Clarke began filming an eighteen months role on the soap opera,  Home and Away, as one of 17 original cast members, playing the character of Ruth "Roo" Stewart. The character of Roo was reinstated in the cast list in 2010, portrayed by Georgie Parker, making the character of Roo one of only two remaining original characters in the series (along with Ray Meagher's character of Alf Stewart). Clarke was one of several Home and Away cast-members to star in an early stage musical about the soap, which toured the UK in 1991.

Following her departure from Home and Away in 1989, Clarke appeared in the short-lived series Family and Friends before going on to act in several mini-series including Come In Spinner and Golden Fiddles.
 
Clarke's film Turning April in 1996 was followed by Blackrock in 1997, in which Heath Ledger played his first credited feature film role. More recently she has starred in the films Danny Deckchair and Look Both Ways. The role of Meryl Lee in Look Both Ways scored Clarke a nomination for an Australian Film Institute (AFI) Lead Actress award in 2005.

In 1999, Clarke became a presenter on long-running ABC Kids television program, Play School. 

After appearing in three episodes of the series Wildside, she played Dr Samantha O'Hara in 21 episodes of All Saints. She also played the leading role in the Australian medical drama The Surgeon and appeared in the third season of the critically acclaimed Australian TV Drama series Love My Way, as Simone.

2009 saw Clarke star in the Showcase television series Tangle. In 2012, she appeared in Woodley. Other television appearances followed, including playing the role of Bernadette in The Time of Our Lives from 2013 to 2014; Eve in House Husbands in 2016, and as Noelene Hogan in Hoges.

In 2010, Clarke starred in the short film Peekaboo.

Clarke created and starred in the popular children's television series The Justine Clarke Show!.

Theatre
An experienced stage actor, Clarke has worked with the Sydney Theatre Company in productions such as The Man with Five Children, Trelawny of the Wells, Cyrano de Bergerac, The Herbal Bed, Hedda Gabler, Stiffs and Muriel's Wedding.

In February–March 2022, Clarke starred in Dennis Kelly's one-woman play, Girls & Boys. The play is staged by State Theatre Company South Australia at the Odeon Theatre, Norwood in Adelaide as part of the Adelaide Festival, and directed by the artistic director of STCSA, Mitchell Butel.

Music

In the 1990s, Clarke performed in a number of bands with fellow Australian thespians, including Loene Carmen and Noah Taylor. These groups included the country and western combo The Honky Tonk Angels; punk band The White Trash Mamas; and the avante-garde Cardboard Box Man. In the late '90s she was a backing vocalist in the Sydney band Automatic Cherry, which also featured The Cruel Sea guitarist James Cruickshank. The band released the album Slow Burner in 1997.

Clarke has released multiple albums through ABC Music and has twice won the ARIA Award for Best Children's Album, in 2013 for A Little Day Out With Justine Clarke and in 2018 for The Justine Clarke Show!.

In 2014, Clarke teamed up with Tex Perkins for series of shows paying tribute to Lee Hazlewood and Nancy Sinatra.

In 2016, Clarke collaborated with singer-songwriter Josh Pyke on 'Words Make The World Go Around', a song to celebrate, promote and raise funds for the work of the Indigenous Literacy Foundation.

Clarke's first-ever, career-spanning greatest hits collection, Everybody Roar! The Best of Justine Clarke, was released in November 2019. In 2019, she released her first ever original Christmas song, "Here Comes a Merry Christmas", written with longtime collaborators Peter Dasent and Arthur Baysting.

Clarke is also a jazz vocalist and cabaret singer, popular on the Sydney club circuit.

Discography

Personal life
Clarke has three children, named Josef, Nina and Max, with her husband, actor Jack Finsterer, and resides in Sydney.

Filmography

Film

Television

Awards and nominations

ARIA Music Awards
The ARIA Music Awards is an annual awards ceremony that recognises excellence, innovation, and achievement across all genres of Australian music. Clarke has won two awards from six nominations.

|-
| 2006
| I Like to Sing
|rowspan="6" | ARIA Award for Best Children's Album
| 
|-
| 2008
| Songs to Make You Smile
| 
|-
| 2010
| Great Big World
| 
|-
| 2013
| A Little Day Out with Justine Clarke
| 
|-
| 2016
| Pyjama Jam
| 
|-
| 2018
| The Justine Clarke Show!
| 
|-

References

External links

1971 births
Living people
ARIA Award winners
Australian child actresses
Australian children's television presenters
Australian people of Belarusian descent
Australian people of Belarusian-Jewish descent
Australian people of Irish descent
Australian stage actresses
Australian television actresses
Australian voice actresses
Australian women television presenters
21st-century Australian singers
21st-century Australian women singers